Diplogrypa is a genus of moths of the family Oecophoridae erected by Ian Francis Bell Common in 1997. It contains only one species, Diplogrypa microptera which was first described by Turner in 1916 and is found Australia, where it has been recorded from Queensland.

The wingspan is 12–14 mm. The forewings are pale fuscous, sparsely sprinkled with fuscous and with a discal dot at two-fifths, a second beneath it on the fold and a third at three-fifths. The hindwings are ochreous whitish, at the apex tinged with fuscous.

References

Moths described in 1916
Oecophorinae